Weidenbach is a municipality in the district of Rhein-Lahn, in Rhineland-Palatinate, in western Germany. Its municipal council consists of six members elected by majority vote, and headed by the honorary mayor, or chairman.

History 
Part of the Landgraviate of Hesse-Kassel since 1583, it was occupied by France between 1806 and 1813. After the Congress of Vienna, it was given to the Duchy of Nassau. By 1866, the territory was under Prussian control. It has been part of Rhineland-Palatinate since 1946.

References

Municipalities in Rhineland-Palatinate
Rhein-Lahn-Kreis